Zendium is a brand of toothpaste marketed by Unilever in Austria, Belgium, Croatia, Czech Republic, France, Germany, Hungary, Italy, the Middle East, the Netherlands, Scandinavia, Slovakia and Switzerland.

History 

Zendium was introduced in the Netherlands in 1976, its formula being based on the enzyme research of Henk Hoogendoorn.

As of 2007, zendium's market share in Denmark was about 37%.

Ingredients 

The active ingredients in Zendium are:

 Enzymes: amyloglucosidase, glucosidase, lactoperoxidase, glucose oxidase and lysozyme.
 Sodium fluoride
 Colostrum
 Lactoferrin
 Potassium thiocyanate
 Sodium fluoride
 Zinc gluconate
 Abrasive: Hydrated silica
Surfactant: Steareth-30

The supporting ingredients in Zendium are:

 Carrageenan
 Citric acid
 Disodium phosphate
 Glyceril
 Hydrated silica
 Sodium benzoate
 Sorbitol
 Steareth-30
 Water
 Xanthan gum

The flavours and colours in Zendium are:

 Aroma
 Sodium Saccharin
 CI 77891

Unlike many types of toothpaste, Zendium products do not contain the foaming agent sodium lauryl sulfate (SDS or NaDS, where D means dodecyl). The lack of SLS protects the mucous membranes and is believed to reduce the risk of aphthous ulcers.
In addition, since Zendium does not contain SLS or similar foaming agents, it can be used together with chlorhexidine.

References

External links 

 Official websites in Denmark, Germany, Italy, the Netherlands, Norway, Sweden.

Brands of toothpaste
Unilever brands
Products introduced in 1976